This is a list of properties and districts in Putnam County, Georgia that are listed on the National Register of Historic Places (NRHP).

Current listings

|}

References

Putnam
Buildings and structures in Putnam County, Georgia